Faraday's law of induction (or simply Faraday's law) is a basic law of electromagnetism predicting how a magnetic field will interact with an electric circuit to produce an electromotive force (emf)—a phenomenon known as electromagnetic induction. It is the fundamental operating principle of transformers, inductors, and many types of electric motors, generators and solenoids.

The Maxwell–Faraday equation (listed as one of Maxwell's equations) describes the fact that a spatially varying (and also possibly time-varying, depending on how a magnetic field varies in time) electric field always accompanies a time-varying magnetic field, while Faraday's law states that there is emf (electromotive force, defined as electromagnetic work done on a unit charge when it has traveled one round of a conductive loop) on the conductive loop when the magnetic flux through the surface enclosed by the loop varies in time.

Faraday's law had been discovered and one aspect of it (transformer emf) was formulated as the Maxwell–Faraday equation later. The equation of Faraday's law can be derived by the Maxwell–Faraday equation (describing transformer emf) and the Lorentz force (describing motional emf). The integral form of the Maxwell–Faraday equation describes only the transformer emf, while the equation of Faraday's law describes both the transformer emf and the motional emf.

History

Electromagnetic induction was discovered independently by Michael Faraday in 1831 and Joseph Henry in 1832. Faraday was the first to publish the results of his experiments. In Faraday's first experimental demonstration of electromagnetic induction (August 29, 1831), he wrapped two wires around opposite sides of an iron ring (torus) (an arrangement similar to a modern toroidal transformer). Based on his assessment of recently discovered properties of electromagnets, he expected that when current started to flow in one wire, a sort of wave would travel through the ring and cause some electrical effect on the opposite side. He plugged one wire into a galvanometer, and watched it as he connected the other wire to a battery. Indeed, he saw a transient current (which he called a "wave of electricity") when he connected the wire to the battery, and another when he disconnected it. This induction was due to the change in magnetic flux that occurred when the battery was connected and disconnected. Within two months, Faraday had found several other manifestations of electromagnetic induction. For example, he saw transient currents when he quickly slid a bar magnet in and out of a coil of wires, and he generated a steady (DC) current by rotating a copper disk near the bar magnet with a sliding electrical lead ("Faraday's disk").

Michael Faraday explained electromagnetic induction using a concept he called lines of force. However, scientists at the time widely rejected his theoretical ideas, mainly because they were not formulated mathematically. An exception was James Clerk Maxwell, who in 1861–62 used Faraday's ideas as the basis of his quantitative electromagnetic theory. In Maxwell's papers, the time-varying aspect of electromagnetic induction is expressed as a differential equation which Oliver Heaviside referred to as Faraday's law even though it is different from the original version of Faraday's law, and does not describe motional emf. Heaviside's version (see Maxwell–Faraday equation below) is the form recognized today in the group of equations known as Maxwell's equations.

Lenz's law, formulated by Emil Lenz in 1834, describes "flux through the circuit", and gives the direction of the induced emf and current resulting from electromagnetic induction (elaborated upon in the examples below).

Faraday's law

The most widespread version of Faraday's law states:

Mathematical statement

For a loop of wire in a magnetic field, the magnetic flux  is defined for any surface  whose boundary is the given loop. Since the wire loop may be moving, we write  for the surface. The magnetic flux is the surface integral:

In more visual terms, the magnetic flux through the wire loop is proportional to the number of magnetic field lines that pass through the loop.

When the flux changes—because  changes, or because the wire loop is moved or deformed, or both—Faraday's law of induction says that the wire loop acquires an emf, defined as the energy available from a unit charge that has traveled once around the wire loop. (Although some sources state the definition differently, this expression was chosen for compatibility with the equations of special relativity.) Equivalently, it is the voltage that would be measured by cutting the wire to create an open circuit, and attaching a voltmeter to the leads.

Faraday's law states that the emf is also given by the rate of change of the magnetic flux:

The direction of the electromotive force is given by Lenz's law.

The laws of induction of electric currents in mathematical form was established by Franz Ernst Neumann in 1845.

Faraday's law contains the information about the relationships between both the magnitudes and the directions of its variables. However, the relationships between the directions are not explicit; they are hidden in the mathematical formula.

It is possible to find out the direction of the electromotive force (emf) directly from Faraday’s law, without invoking Lenz's law. A left hand rule helps doing that, as follows:
 Align the curved fingers of the left hand with the loop (yellow line).
 Stretch your thumb.
Determine the initial and final fluxes (whose difference is ) with respect to the normal , as indicated by the stretched thumb.
 If the change in flux, is positive, the curved fingers show the direction of the electromotive force (yellow arrowheads).
 If  is negative, the direction of the electromotive force is opposite to the direction of the curved fingers (opposite to the yellow arrowheads).

For a tightly wound coil of wire, composed of  identical turns, each with the same , Faraday's law of induction states that

Maxwell–Faraday equation

The Maxwell–Faraday equation states that a time-varying magnetic field always accompanies a spatially varying (also possibly time-varying), non-conservative electric field, and vice versa. The Maxwell–Faraday equation is

These fields can generally be functions of position  and time .

The Maxwell–Faraday equation is one of the four Maxwell's equations, and therefore plays a fundamental role in the theory of classical electromagnetism. It can also be written in an integral form by the Kelvin–Stokes theorem, thereby reproducing Faraday's law:

Its direction is orthogonal to that surface patch, the magnitude is the area of an infinitesimal patch of surface.

Both  and  have a sign ambiguity; to get the correct sign, the right-hand rule is used, as explained in the article Kelvin–Stokes theorem. For a planar surface , a positive path element  of curve  is defined by the right-hand rule as one that points with the fingers of the right hand when the thumb points in the direction of the normal  to the surface .

A charge-generated -field can be expressed as the gradient of a scalar field that is a solution to Poisson's equation, and has a zero path integral. See gradient theorem.

The integral equation is true for any path  through space, and any surface  for which that path is a boundary.

If the surface  is not changing in time, the equation can be rewritten:

The surface integral at the right-hand side is the explicit expression for the magnetic flux  through .

The electric vector field induced by a changing magnetic flux, the solenoidal component of the overall electric field, can be approximated in the non-relativistic limit by the volume integral equation

Proof
The four Maxwell's equations (including the Maxwell–Faraday equation), along with Lorentz force law, are a sufficient foundation to derive everything in classical electromagnetism. Therefore, it is possible to "prove" Faraday's law starting with these equations.

The starting point is the time-derivative of flux through an arbitrary surface  (that can be moved or deformed) in space:

(by definition). This total time derivative can be evaluated and simplified with the help of the Maxwell–Faraday equation and some vector identities; the details are in the box below:

The result is:

In the case of a conductive loop, emf (Electromotive Force) is the electromagnetic work done on a unit charge when it has traveled around the loop once, and this work is done by the Lorentz force.  Therefore, emf is expressed as

Mathematically,

Now we can see that, for the conductive loop, emf is same to the time-derivative of the magnetic flux through the loop except for the sign on it. Therefore, we now reach the equation of Faraday's law (for the conductive loop) as

where .

Exceptions

This statement, however, is not always true and the reason is not just from the obvious reason that emf is undefined in empty space when no conductor is present. As noted in the previous section, Faraday's law is not guaranteed to work unless the velocity of the abstract curve  matches the actual velocity of the material conducting the electricity.

One can analyze examples like these by taking care that the path  moves with the same velocity as the material. Alternatively, one can always correctly calculate the emf by combining Lorentz force law with the Maxwell–Faraday equation:

where "it is very important to notice that (1)  is the velocity of the conductor ... not the velocity of the path element  and (2) in general, the partial derivative with respect to time cannot be moved outside the integral since the area is a function of time."

Faraday's law and relativity

Two phenomena
Faraday's law is a single equation describing two different phenomena: the motional emf generated by a magnetic force on a moving wire (see the Lorentz force), and the transformer emf generated by an electric force due to a changing magnetic field (described by the Maxwell–Faraday equation).

James Clerk Maxwell drew attention to this fact in his 1861 paper On Physical Lines of Force. In the latter half of Part II of that paper, Maxwell gives a separate physical explanation for each of the two phenomena.

A reference to these two aspects of electromagnetic induction is made in some modern textbooks. As Richard Feynman states:

Explanation based on four-dimensional formalism 
In the general case, explanation of the motional emf appearance by action of the magnetic force on the charges in the moving wire or in the circuit changing its area is unsatisfactory. As a matter of fact, the charges in the wire or in the circuit could be completely absent, will then the electromagnetic induction effect disappear in this case? This situation is analyzed in the article, in which, when writing the integral equations of the electromagnetic field in a four-dimensional covariant form, in the Faraday’s law the total time derivative of the magnetic flux through the circuit appears instead of the partial time derivative. Thus, electromagnetic induction appears either when the magnetic field changes over time or when the area of the circuit changes. From the physical point of view, it is better to speak not about the induction emf, but about the induced electric field strength , that occurs in the circuit when the magnetic flux changes. If the circuit area is changing in case of the constant magnetic field, then some part of the circuit is inevitably moving, and the electric field  emerges in this part of the circuit in the comoving reference frame K’ as a result of the Lorentz transformation of the magnetic field , present in the stationary reference frame K, which passes through the circuit. The presence of the field  in K’ is considered as a result of the induction effect in the moving circuit, regardless of whether the charges are present in the circuit or not. In the conducting circuit, the field  causes motion of the charges.

Einstein's view
Reflection on this apparent dichotomy was one of the principal paths that led Albert Einstein to develop special relativity:

See also

References

Further reading

External links

 A simple interactive tutorial on electromagnetic induction (click and drag magnet back and forth) National High Magnetic Field Laboratory
 Roberto Vega. Induction: Faraday's law and Lenz's law – Highly animated lecture, with sound effects, Electricity and Magnetism course page
 Notes from Physics and Astronomy HyperPhysics at Georgia State University
 Tankersley and Mosca: Introducing Faraday's law
 A free simulation on motional emf

Faraday's law of electromagnetic induction
Michael Faraday
Maxwell's equations